Hericium erinaceus (also called lion's mane mushroom, mountain-priest mushroom, bearded tooth fungus, and bearded hedgehog) is an edible mushroom belonging to the tooth fungus group. Native to North America, Europe, and Asia, it can be identified by its long spines (greater than 1 cm length), occurrence on hardwoods, and tendency to grow a single clump of dangling spines. The fruit bodies can be harvested for culinary use. 

Hericium erinaceus can be mistaken for other species of Hericium, which grow across the same range. In the wild, these mushrooms are common during late summer and fall on hardwoods, particularly American beech and maple. Usually H. erinaceus is considered saprophytic, as it mostly feeds on dead trees. However, it can also be found on living trees, so may be a tree parasite. This could indicate an endophytic habitat.

Common names 
Both the Latin genus name  and the species name  mean 'hedgehog' in Latin. This is also reflected by the German name,  (literally, 'hedgehog goatee'), and some of its common English names, such as bearded hedgehog and hedgehog mushroom. 

Morphology 
The fruitbodies of H. erinaceus are large, irregular bulbous tubercules. The color of fruit bodies and spines are white to cream, but can turn yellow-brown when older.

The hyphal system is monomitic, amyloid, and composed of thin- to thick-walled hyphae that are approximately 3–15 microns (um) wide. The hyphae also contain clamped septa and gloeoplerous elements (filled with oily, resinous substances), which can come into the hymenium as gloeocystidia.

The basidia are 25–40 µm long and 5–7 µm wide, contain four spores each and possess a basal clamp. The white amyloid basidiospores measure approximately 5–7 µm in length and 4–5 µm in width. The spore shape is described as subglobose to short ellipsoid and the spore surface is smooth to finely roughened.

Development 
The fruitbodies of H. erinaceus are mainly produced annually from August to November in Europe. It was observed that H. erinaceus could fruit intermittently for 20 years on the same dead tree. It is hypothesized that H. erinaceus can survive for 40 years. The mating system of H. erinaceus species found in the USA was shown to be bifactorially heterothallic.

The monokaryotic mycelium growth of H.erinaceus is slower than dikaryotic growth and only a relatively low percentage of monokaryotic cultures yield fruitbodies. Monokaryotic fruitbodies are also smaller than dikaryotic fruitbodies. The monokaryotic mycelium was found to produce fusoid to subglobose chlamydospores of 6–8 x 8–10 µm size. These spores can stay viable for more than seven years and be stored under anaerobic conditions. Chlamydospore germination requires 30 to 52 hours, with a germination success rate of 32 to 54%.

Spore production is highest at midday, relative to temperature increase and a decrease of relative humidity. Daily trends toward lower relative humidity can favor sporulation, however, levels of relative humidity that are too low do not favor high total spore production.

Distribution 
Hericium species can be found throughout the northern hemisphere. Hericium erinaceus has been used in traditional Chinese medicine for centuries. Its production is widespread within Asia, mostly using extensive production practices on wood logs or stumps.

Despite its higher prevalence in Asia, H. erinaceus was first described scientifically in North America. Its production there occurs only on a small scale. Most of it is intensive indoor production with only a few small outdoor sites where log cultivation is practiced. Three Hericium species can be found in eastern North America, one being H. erinaceus, the other two H. americanum and H. coralloides.

Although H. erinaceus is native to Europe, it has been red listed in 13 European countries due to poor germination and establishment. In the United Kingdom, this specific genus fruits between August and December and will continue to produce spores until as late as February in the following year. It is able to withstand cold temperatures and frost conditions.

Conservation 
Hericium erinaceus is scarce and threatened and is one of only four fungi to have the highest level of legal protection in the United Kingdom, making both picking and sale of the fungus illegal.

Strains and yield 
In fungi cultivation, fungal strains are analogous to plant varieties in crop breeding. Fungal strains comprise clonal descendants of a single isolation from one fungal colony in a pure culture. Hericium spp. grow in the wild in North America, Europe, and Asia and, although there is considerable scientific research about them, they are not commonly industrially produced. Accordingly, there are few commercially available strains in the USA or Europe and little or no breeding for higher yield or other favorable traits has occurred.  Production trials in Egypt report yields of H. erinaceus averaging at 165g per 1 kg medium.

Uses
Hericium erinaceus produces edible fruiting bodies that have uses as food and in traditional medicine, including one guide previously misquoted as having considered it to be inedible.

Culinary use

Hericium erinaceus is common in gourmet cooking. Young specimens are considered the best. Alongside shiitake (Lentinus edodes) and oyster (Pleurotus ostreatus) mushrooms, H. erinaceus is used as a specialty mushroom. Its flavor may be compared to that of lobster. The production of specialty mushrooms in the USA increased by about 23% between 2010 and 2018 from 7-9 million kg. 

Hericium erinaceus fruiting bodies contain 57% carbohydrates (8% as dietary fiber), 4% fat, and 22% protein.

Phytochemicals

Hericium erinaceus contains diverse phytochemicals, including polysaccharides, such as β-glucan, as well as hericenones and erinacines. From its essential oil, 77 aroma and flavor compounds were identified, including hexadecanoic acid (26% of total oil composition), linoleic acid (13%), phenylacetaldehyde (9%) and benzaldehyde (3%), and other oils, such as 2-methyl-3-furanthiol, 2-ethylpyrazine and 2,6-diethylpyrazine. Low concentrations of ergosterol are present.

Ecology

Disease
Brennandania lambi (Acari: Pygmephoroidea) is a mite pest of fungi culture in China. This mite can develop and reproduce on the mycelium of H. erinaceus. Farm hygiene and heating treatments are the most important pest management strategies that should be followed to counter this acarus.

Competition with other fungi
Hericium species are good competitors against other wood colonisers. They show the ability to maintain their place on dead wood, also when confronted with secondary colonizers such as Trametes versicolor and Stereum hirsutum. Hericium erinaceus has shown to be slightly more competitive than other fungi tooth species, including Creolophus cirrhatus and Hericium coralloides.

Cultivation

Substrate requirements
As a saprophyte that occurs on dead wood, H. erinaceus requires adequate substrate factors, including suitable carbon and nitrogen sources, a certain pH value and ideal carbon/nitrogen ratio. 

Many different substrates have been used successfully for culitivation of this mushroom. Depending on the type of cultivation, the substrate can be either solid (artificial log) or liquid (submerged culture and deep submerged culture). 

The solid substrate is most commonly a mixture of sawdust of hardwood or conifer containing different complements that may include wheat bran, wheat straw, soybean meal, corn meal, rice bran, and rice straw. For example, H. erinaceus strains grow on beech sawdust substrate enriched with wheat bran (20%), rye grain (25%), soybean meal (7%), rapeseed meal (10%), or meat-osseous flour (6%). 

An example of a liquid substrate composition can be glucose for the carbon source, soybean powder, corn powder, and wheat bran powder as a complex nitrogen source. The pH values most suitable for the favorable growth of H. erinaceus were in the range of 5.0 - 9.0, with pH 6.0 as optimal.

Climate-requirements
Hericium erinaceus requires a humid environment for its growth: 85 to 90% of relative humidity in the air. The incubation temperature most suitable for the mycelial growth of H. erinaceus was found to be 25 °C, and the optimum temperature for vegetative growth was 26 °C. H. erinaceus is unable to grow with a water potential lower than -5 Mpa.

Cultivation-techniques
The artificial cultivation of H. erinaceus was first reported in China in 1988. It is cultivated using artificial logs, bottles, and polypropylene bags. However, this type of artificial cultivation is not suitable for industrialized production due to its low yield and long cultivation cycles.

Submerged culture is a type of artificial cultivation of H. erinaceus whereby the fungus is grown in a liquid medium. Using this method, a large number of mycelia can be obtained quickly. Bioactive compounds can be sourced from the fruiting bodies, submerged-cultivated mycelial biomass, or liquid-cultivated broth. Growers optimize the culture medium composition to obtain simultaneously high yields of H. erinaceus mycelial biomass, exopolysaccharides, and polysaccharides. Submerged fermentation is preferable for the production of mycelial biomass and biologically active metabolites in order to produce a more uniform biomass and extract products.

Growth regulators, such as 2,4-Dichlorophenoxyacetic acid and gibberellin, were observed to have an advantageous effect on spore germination. Other technologies, such as red and green laser light of low intensity, stimulated spore germination as well as the vegetative growth of mycelium. Argon and helium lasers also contributed to the acceleration of fruit body development by 36–51%.

Wild strains
Wild strains of Hericium spp. can be isolated and cultivated by first gathering fruiting bodies from fallen trees in the natural habitat. The fruiting bodies can then be opened to attain pieces of their inner spore-producing tissue. This tissue is then placed onto petri dishes with agar to cultivate fungal colonies at 25 °C. After several transfers to new petri dishes to verify the purity of the strain, it can be kept at −80 °C for long-term storage.

Similar species
Similar species include Hericium americanum and Hericium coralloides.

Gallery

See also
 Medicinal fungi

References

Russulales
Chinese edible mushrooms
Edible fungi
Fungi in cultivation
Fungi of Asia
Fungi of Europe
Fungi of California
Fungi of North America
Medicinal fungi
Fungi described in 1781
Taxa named by Jean Baptiste François Pierre Bulliard